Pycnogaster is a genus of bush crickets in the tribe Bradyporini erected by Mariano de la Paz Graells y de la Agüera in 1851.  To date (2022) species have been recorded from the Iberian peninsula and North Africa.

Species 
The Orthoptera Species File lists:
subgenus Bradygaster Bolívar, 1926
 Pycnogaster algecirensis Bolívar, 1926
 Pycnogaster finotii Bolívar, 1881
 Pycnogaster gaditana Bolívar, 1900
 Pycnogaster inermis (Rambur, 1838)
 Pycnogaster ribesiglesiasii Olmo-Vidal, 2021
 Pycnogaster sanchezgomezi Bolívar, 1897
subgenus Pycnogaster Graells, 1851
 Pycnogaster cucullatus (Charpentier, 1825)
 Pycnogaster graellsii Bolívar, 1873
 Pycnogaster jugicola Graells, 1851 - type species
 Pycnogaster valentini Pinedo & Llorente del Moral, 1987

References

External links 

Orthoptera of Africa
Orthoptera of Europe
Ensifera genera
Bradyporinae